The Permit System was a piece of federal legislation in 19th century Canada that controlled Indigenous farmers ability to sell and trade goods in parts of Canada. The legislation outlined the restrictions placed upon Indigenous farmers, and was assented to in 1881. The assented to amendment stated that any “sale, barter, exchange, or gift” from an Indigenous person of “any grain or root crops, or other produce grown upon any Indian Reserve in the Northwest Territories, the Province of Manitoba, or the District of Keewatin” was prohibited, unless approval could be given by the Governor in Council.[1] Furthermore, anyone caught receiving goods from First Nations band members without approval could be fined up to a hundred dollars and spend up to three months in jail.

An unstable economy caused hardships for settlers due to competition from a large influx of immigrants, and a drop in the price of goods may have contributed to the creation of legal discrimination against Indigenous farmers in these areas. The economic climate of the prairies from the 1870’s-90’s changed rapidly with this immigration which, as Carl Beal argues, caused the prairie market of the 1880s to become saturated with product and laborers, supply outpaced demand, and prices of goods fell. Indigenous farmers were cited as the problem by some settler merchants in the local newspaper. Beal highlights this ongoing debate recorded in the Saskatchewan Herald: although many people were critical of the accusations that Indigenous farmers were causing market problems for settlers, in October 1888 the Saskatchewan Herald quoted Indian Agent Hayter Reed as saying that the Department of Indian Affairs “would do whatever it reasonably could to prevent the Indian from entering into competition with the settlers during the present hard times.” 
[1] Carl Beal and Paul Phillips, “Money, Markets and Economic Development in Saskatchewan Indian Reserve Communities, 1870-1930s,” (PhD diss., University of Manitoba, 1994), 163-165.

[2] Ibid, 166.

[3] Ibid, 168.
[1]Indigenous and Northern Affairs Canada, “An Act to Amend ‘The Indian Act, 1880.’” last modified                                                   September 15, 2010, https://www.aadnc-aandc.gc.ca/eng/1100100010280/1100100010282.

[2] Ibid.

References 

1881 in Canadian law
Canadian Aboriginal and indigenous law
Agriculture legislation
Indigenous rights in Canada